Galupadeh (also Romanized as Galūpadeh and Gelūpadeh; also known as Kelūpadeh and Kelūpareh) is a village in Howmeh Rural District, in the Central District of Bam County, Kerman Province, Iran. At the 2006 census, its population was 101, in 24 families.

References 

Populated places in Bam County